Eriogonum siskiyouense is a rare species of wild buckwheat known by the common name Siskiyou buckwheat.

Distribution
The plant is endemic to far northern California. It is known only from the area between Mount Eddy in the Trinity Mountains and the Scott Mountains, around the border of Siskiyou County and Trinity County.  Both ranges are in the southern Klamath Mountains System.

Description
It bears clusters of small rounded to oval leaves each under a centimeter long and coated in gray woolly fibers at least on the undersides.

The flowering stem arising from the caudex has a whorl of two to four leaflike bracts around the middle and is otherwise naked but for a coat of woolly hairs. Atop the scape are the bright yellow flowers, which are usually arranged in a spherical cluster.

External links
 Calflora Database: Eriogonum siskiyouense (Siskiyou buckwheat)
Jepson Manual eFlora (TJM2) treatment of Eriogonum siskiyouense
U.C. Photos gallery of Eriogonum siskiyouense

siskiyouense
Endemic flora of California
Flora of the Klamath Mountains
Natural history of Siskiyou County, California
Natural history of Trinity County, California
~
~
Plants described in 1898
Flora without expected TNC conservation status